
This is a list of places in Northern Cyprus which have standing links to local communities in other countries known as "town twinning" (usually in Europe) or "sister cities" (usually in the rest of the world).

Lefkoşa District

Gönyeli
 Kızılcahamam, Ankara Turkey since 2009 
 Sarıyer, İstanbul Turkey

North Nicosia (Lefkoşa)
 Ankara, Turkey since 1989 
 Gaziantep, Turkey since 2009 
 İstanbul, Turkey

Kythrea (Değirmenlik)
 Gebze, Kocaeli Turkey since 1996

Gazimağusa District

Famagusta
 İzmir, Turkey, since 1997 
 Antalya, Turkey, since 1997

Akanthou (Tatlısu)
 Tarsus, Mersin Turkey
 Sumqayit, Azerbaijan since 2005
 Altınova, Yalova Turkey

Lefkoniko (Geçitkale)
 Yalova Turkey

Ayios Seryios (Yeni Boğaziçi)
 Zabrat, Azerbaijan since 2005

Vatili (Vadili)
 Osmaniye, Turkey

Pergamos (Beyarmudu)
 Sarıyer, İstanbul Turkey
 Kepez, Antalya Turkey
 Karaman, Turkey since 2013

Girne District

Kyrenia (Girne)
 Mudanya, Bursa Turkey since 1999
 Bucharest Sector 4, Romania since 2013
 Adana, Turkey
 Çankaya, Ankara Turkey

Agios Epiktitos (Çatalköy)
 Belek, Antalya Turkey

Lapithos (Lapta)
 Büyükçekmece, Istanbul Turkey
 Kemer, Antalya Turkey

Agios Amvrosios (Esentepe)
 Kırıkkale, Turkey
 Kartal, İstanbul Turkey

Karavas (Alsancak)
 Bornova, İzmir Turkey

Güzelyurt District

Morphou (Güzelyurt)
 Zeytinburnu, Istanbul Turkey
 Keçiören, Ankara Turkey
 Beşiktaş, Istanbul Turkey
 Manisa, Turkey
 Çekmeköy, Istanbul Turkey
 Kırşehir, Turkey

Lefka (Lefke)
 Bergama, İzmir Turkey
 Malatya, Turkey
 Silifke, Mersin Turkey
 Elmadağ, Ankara Turkey

İskele District

Trikomo (İskele)
 Samsun, Turkey
 Mamak, Ankara Turkey
 Pendik, İstanbul Turkey

Galateia (Mehmetçik)
 Osmangazi, Bursa Turkey
 Bağcılar, Istanbul Turkey

Yialousa (Yeni Erenköy)
 Sincan, Ankara Turkey

Rizokarpaso (Dipkarpaz)
 Ankara, Turkey since 1986
 Pendik, İstanbul Turkey since 1986
 Yasamal, Baku Azerbaijan since 2005
 Ardeşen, Rize Turkey
 Tatvan, Bitlis Turkey

Komi Kebir (Büyükkonuk)
 Kaymaklı, Nevşehir Turkey since 2005

References

Lists of populated places in Northern Cyprus
Northern Cyprus
Northern Cyprus